Sir Shiu-kin Tang CBE, KStJ, JP (21 March 1901 – 19 June 1986) was a Hong Kong entrepreneur and philanthropist. In 1933, he co-founded Kowloon Motor Bus and is known through the public service institutions he funded and founded in Hong Kong, many of which bear his name.

He served as chairman of both Tung Wah Group of Hospitals and Po Leung Kuk.

Early life and the Battle of Hong Kong
Tang was born in Hong Kong into a wealthy family. His father was Tang Chi Ngong JP, a banker.  His mother 章順婉 was fourth wife and he was the second of four brothers. He attended Queen's College and St. Stephen's College.

During the Battle of Hong Kong, Tang Shiu-kin was almost killed by Japanese forces in Happy Valley on 23 December, 1941, two days before the fall of the territory. He, along with other two other businessmen, was drafted to serve on the Hong Kong reserve police force and found in possession of helmets and trench coats. Along with other civilians and Nationalist Chinese officials, he was bayonetted by the soldiers and dumped into a drainage ditch.

Philanthropy
It is estimated that in his lifetime Tang contributed at least HK$100 million (amounts at that time) for worthy causes.

Family
Tang's eldest grandson, born to the only son of his 'first concubine', was David Tang, founder of the Shanghai Tang fashion chain, though Tang Shui Kin early on ejected the whole family with very little financial support, according to David Tang.

See also
 Tang Shiu Kin Hospital
 Sai Kung Tang Shiu Kin Sports Ground
 Tuen Mun Tang Shiu Kin Sports Ground
 Tang Shiu Kin Victoria Government Secondary School
 Sheng Kung Hui Tang Shiu Kin Secondary School

References

1901 births
1986 deaths
Hong Kong businesspeople
Hong Kong philanthropists
Kowloon Motor Bus
20th-century philanthropists
Alumni of Queen's College, Hong Kong
Order of Saint John (chartered 1888)
Commanders of the Order of the British Empire
Tang family